WIMC (103.9 FM, "Thunder 103.9") is a radio station broadcasting a classic rock format. Licensed to Crawfordsville, Indiana, the station serves West-Central Indiana, and is owned by Forcht Broadcasting.

References

External links
WIMC's official website

IMC
Crawfordsville, Indiana
Radio stations established in 1974
1974 establishments in Indiana
Classic rock radio stations in the United States